Machaeropterus is a genus of passerine birds in the manakin family Pipridae. They are found in the tropical forests of South America.

Taxonomy
The genus Machaeropterus was introduced by the French naturalist Charles Lucien Bonaparte in 1854. The type species was subsequently designated as the kinglet manakin. The name Machaeropterus combines the Ancient Greek words  μαχαιρα makhaira  "knife" or "dagger" and -πτερος -pteros "-winged".

The genus contains the five species:

References

 
Pipridae
Bird genera
Taxa named by Charles Lucien Bonaparte
Taxonomy articles created by Polbot